Thai Stick – Surfers, Scammers and the Untold Story of the Marijuana Trade is a 2013 book by Peter H. Maguire about the illicit cannabis trade in Southeast Asia. The book was published by Columbia University Press, and in 2015, it was optioned by surfing competitor Kelly Slater to become a documentary film and television series.

See also
 List of books about cannabis

References

Further reading

2013 non-fiction books
American books about cannabis
Non-fiction books about cannabis
Columbia University Press books